= Poloo =

Ghanaian snack

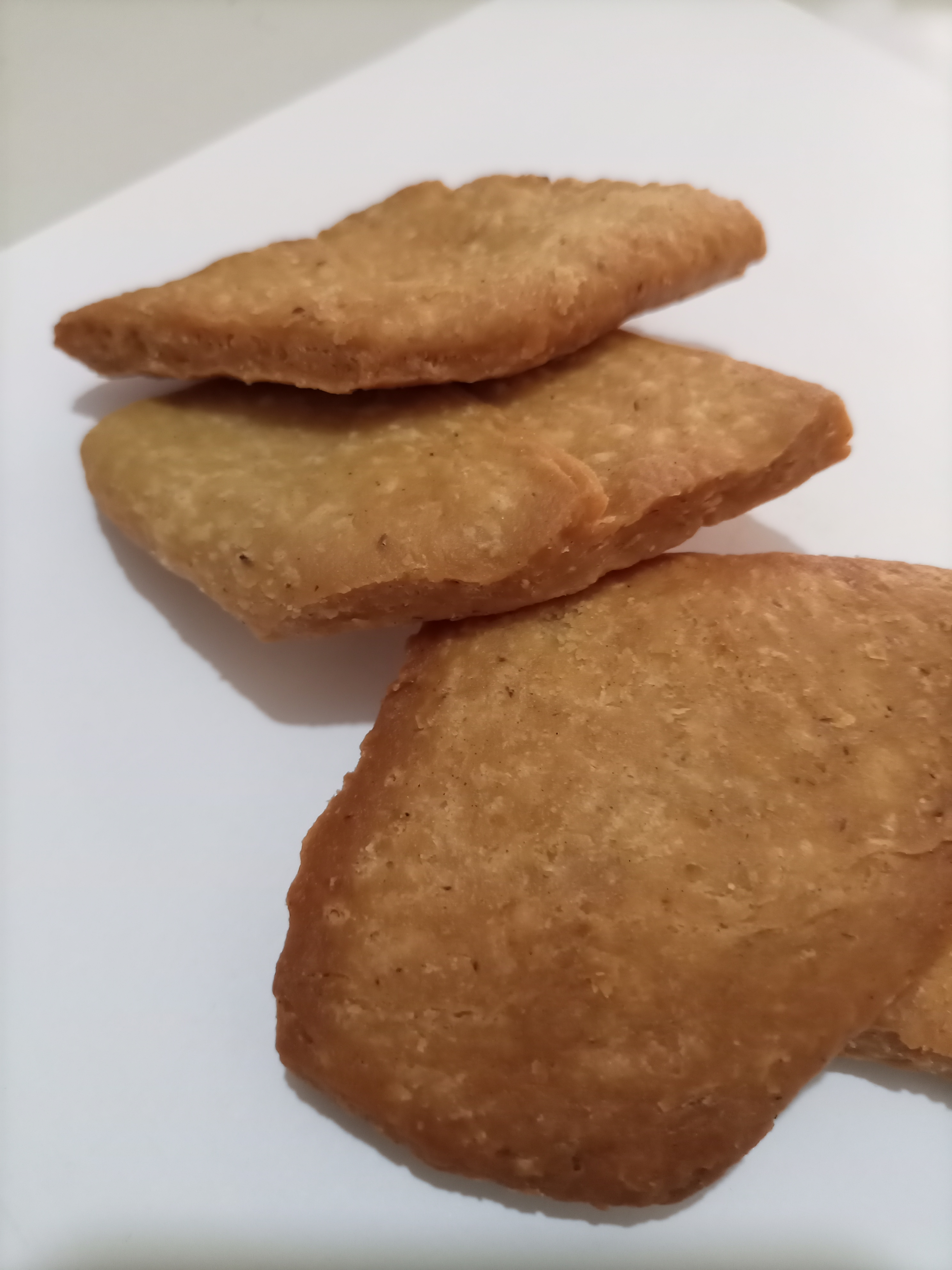
- Course: Snack
- Place of origin: Ghana
- Serving temperature: Hot/Cold
- Main ingredients: Flour, Desiccated coconut, Water, Salt, Sugar, Vegetable Oil

Poloo is a Ghanaian snack which is referred to as fried coconut dough or fried biscuit.
